Luca Belluzzi (born 7 July 1977) is a Sammarinese sailor. He competed in the Laser event at the 1996 Summer Olympics.

References

External links
 

1977 births
Living people
Sammarinese male sailors (sport)
Olympic sailors of San Marino
Sailors at the 1996 Summer Olympics – Laser
Place of birth missing (living people)